Juan de Herrera is a municipality and town in the San Juan province of the Dominican Republic.

Sources 
 – World-Gazetteer.com

External links
 

Municipalities of the Dominican Republic
Populated places in San Juan Province (Dominican Republic)